The College of Commissioners-General (French: Collège des Commissaires-generaux) was a body of university graduates that acted as the third government of the Democratic Republic of the Congo (then Republic of the Congo) under the leadership of Albert Ndele from 20 September 1960 to 3 October 1960 and Justin Marie Bomboko from 3 October 1960 until 9 February 1961.

Background 
On 24 June 1960 the Lumumba Government was installed as the first indigenous government of the new Republic of the Congo. Independence followed on 30 June 1960, but governing became chaotic amid an army mutiny, disorder, and Belgian intervention.

Throughout August 1960 President Joseph Kasa-Vubu became increasingly bothered by Prime Minister Patrice Lumumba's growing authoritarianism, the collapse in administration, and the enlarging prospects of civil war. On 5 September Kasa-Vubu announced the revocation of Lumumba's ministerial mandate, along with the dismissal of Deputy Prime Minister Antoine Gizenga, three other ministers, and two secretaries of state over the radio. He stated that the President of the Senate, Joseph Iléo, would form a new government. After Lumumba heard of the firing he held heated discussions with his ministers and made three broadcasts, defending his government and declaring Kasa-Vubu to be deposed.

Two days later the Chamber of Deputies convened to discuss Kasa-Vubu's dismissal order. The Chamber voted to annul both Kasa-Vubu's and Lumumba's declarations of dismissal, 60 to 19. The following day the Senate delivered the Lumumba Government a vote of confidence, 49 to zero with seven abstentions. According to Article 51, Parliament was granted the "exclusive privilege" to interpret the constitution. In cases of doubt and controversy, the Congolese were originally supposed to appeal constitutional questions to the Belgian Conseil d'État. With the rupture of relations in July this was no longer possible, so no authoritative interpretation or mediation was available to bring a legal resolution to the dispute.

Mobutu's coup 
On 14 September Colonel Joseph-Desiré Mobutu announced over the radio that he was launching a 'peaceful revolution' to break the political impasse and therefore neutralising the President, Lumumba's and Iléo's respective governments, and Parliament until 31 December. He stated that "technicians" would run the administration while the politicians sorted out their differences. In a subsequent press conference he clarified that Congolese university graduates would be asked to form a government and further declared that all Eastern Bloc countries should close their embassies. Lumumba and Kasa-Vubu were both surprised by the coup.

Organisation and establishment 
On 20 September Mobutu announced the formation of the College of Commissioners-General under the chairmanship of Justin Marie Bomboko. Soldiers expelled the remaining politicians from their offices. Of the Commissioners-General, Albert Ndele, Joseph Mbeka, and Martin Ngwete had all been chef de cabinet to a minister in the Lumumba Government. Damien Kandolo, chef de cabinet to Lumumba, was also made a commissioner. Both Thomas Kanza and Andrè Mandi, members of Lumumba's government, were invited to join the College. Though the latter attended the College's early sessions, both became disturbed by the body's inclination towards Kasa-Vubu and summarily refused to participate in the administration. Their abstention allowed the government's anti-Lumumba slant to worsen without restraint. Meanwhile, Lumumba's Minister of Youth and Sports, Maurice Mpolo attempted to undermine the College and rivaled Mobutu for control of the army.

Composition 
The full list of commissioners was printed in the Moniteur Congolais on 10 October. The following all served during the College's existence:

Commissioners-general 

 Commissioner-General for Foreign Affairs and External Commerce and President of the College Justin Bomboko (Free University of Brussels)
 Commissioner-General for Finance and Monetary Questions and Vice-President of the College Albert Ndele (Catholic University of Leuven)
 Commissioner-General for Labour and Social Problems Charles Bokonga (Catholic University of Leuven)
 Commissioner-General for National Education and Youth and Sports and Spokesman of the College Mario Cardoso (Catholic University of Leuven)
 Commissioner-General for Public Function Valentin Bindo Albi (Free University of Brussels)
 Commissioner-General for National Defence Ferdinand Kazadi (Lovanium University)
 Commissioner-General for Agriculture and the Middle Class Pierre Lebughe (Lovanium University)
 Commissioner-General for Justice Marcel Lihau (Catholic University of Leuven)
 Commissioner-General for Public Works Joseph Masanga (Lovanium University)
 Commissioner-General for Economic Co-ordination and Planning Joseph Mbeka (Lovanium University)
 Commissioner-General for Information and Spokesman of the College Albert Bolela (Catholic University of Leuven)
 Commissioner-General for Social Affairs Albert Mpase (Catholic University of Leuven)
 Commissioner-General for Telecommunications Aubert Mukendi (University of Liège)
 Commissioner-General for Interior José Nussbaumer (Catholic University of Leuven)
 Commissioner-General for Public Health Marcel Tshibamba (Lovanium University)

Commissioners 

 Commissioner for Social Affairs Albert Atunda 
 Commissioner for National Education and Youth and Sports Cléophas Bizala
 Commissioner for National Education Honoré Waku
 Commissioner for Labour and Social Problems André Bo-Boliko
 Commissioner for Interior Damien Kondolo
 Commissioner for Interior Jonas Mukamba
 Commissioner for Foreign Affairs and External Commerce Ernest Kashemwa
 Commissioner for Foreign Affairs and External Commerce Evariste Loliki
 Commissioner for Economic Co-ordination and Planning Julien Kasongo
 Commissioner for Information Pascal Kapella
 Commissioner for Information Zépherin Konde
 Commissioner for Public Function François Kungula
 Commissioner for Public Function Félicien Lukusa
 Commissioner for Finance Paul Mushiete 
 Commissioner for Agriculture Claude Ngondo
 Commissioner for the Middle Class Jean-Marie Ngyesse François
 Commissioner for Transport and Communications Gilbert Pongo
 Commissioner for Justice Etienne Tshisekedi
 Commissioner for National Defence Nestor Watum
 Commissioner for Public Works Henri Takizala
 Commissioner for Public Works Joseph Posho
 Commissioner for Public Health Martin Ngwete

Tenure 
On 11 October Kasa-Vubu issued a "constitutional decree-law" officiating the establishment of the College of Commissioners-General, asserting his right as Head of State to appoint and dismiss its members, adjourning Parliament indefinitely, and conferring all legislative authority prescribed to Parliament by the Loi Fondementale to the College. In time, the College would come to bring about the restoration of some order to the administration that had been lost during the Lumumba Government's tenure. Lumumba frequently attacked the body's credibility. As the end of the year approached Mobutu backed away from his promise of restoring democratic processes after December and postponed the return to normal governance indefinitely.

In an attempt to indicate a reorientation towards legality, the College of Commissioners was dissolved by Kasa-Vubu on 9 February 1961 and replaced by a new cabinet under Iléo.

Aftermath 
Bomboko returned to his post as Minister of Foreign Affairs.

Notes

Citations

References 

 
 
 
 
 
 
 
 
 
 

Government of the Democratic Republic of the Congo
1960 establishments in Africa
1961 disestablishments in Africa